Islamic hip hop may refer to:

 Middle Eastern hip hop
 IAM
 Islamic Force
 Dirty Kuffar
 Salome MC
 Jihadism and hip hop